Today was an EP released by Everlast in 1999 under the Tommy Boy record label. The "Today" EP included the Grammy Award winning song "Put Your Lights On", a collaboration with Latin-rock musician Carlos Santana. This collaboration would also be featured on Santanas album titled "Supernatural". The "Today" EP was published in various editions.

Track listings

Worldwide 8-track edition
 Today (Watch Me Shine) Remix  	 
 Put Your Lights On (feat. Carlos Santana)	
 What It's Like (Live) 	
 Jump Around (Live) 	
 Only Love Can Break Your Heart 	
 Some Nights (Are Better Than Others)
 Hot to Death (Live)
 Blues for X'Mas

Japan 9-track edition
 Today (Watch Me Shine) Remix  	 
 Put Your Lights On (feat. Carlos Santana)
 What It's Like (Live) 	
 Jump Around (Live) 	
 Only Love Can Break Your Heart 	
 Some Nights (Are Better Than Others)
 Hot to Death (Live) 	
 Blues for X'Mas
 Today (Exclusive Remix for Japan)

US 5-track edition
 Today (Watch Me Shine) Remix  	 
 Put Your Lights On feat. Carlos Santana 	
 What It's Like (Live) 	
 Jump Around (Live) 	
 Blues For X'Mas

References

1999 EPs
Everlast (musician) albums